(known in English as The Wandering Unicorn) is a 1965 fantasy novel by the Argentine author Manuel Mujica Lainez based on the legend of Melusine. Set in medieval France and Palestine of the Crusades, Mujica Lainez’s novel is a mixture of fantasy and romance which is narrated from the perspective of the shapeshifting Melusine.

Background
The events of the original legend of the medieval Romance are recollected early in the novel. Melusine, a fairy, marries Raimondin of Lusignan. However, when he spies her transformed as half-serpent, she flies away with frightful screams. Associated through marriage with the Lusignan family, Melusine appears over the centuries on the towers of their castle, wailing mournfully whenever a disaster or death in the family is imminent.

Plot
Melusine embarks upon an adventure and unrequited love affair with Aiol, the son of Ozil, a crusader knight who bequeaths a unicorn's lance to his son. Together the young knight Aiol and Melusine travel across Europe encountering monsters, angels and Knights Templar, before eventually arriving in war-torn Jerusalem of the Crusades era.

Mujica Lainez’s novel generates empathy towards Melusine as she recollects her adventures, before the love affair between a mortal and an immortal concludes in a tragic ending.

Editions
The Wandering Unicorn (1965) translated by Mary Fitton, with an introduction by Jorge Luis Borges, Berkley Books, 1985

Awards and nominations
 World Fantasy Award—Novel (Finalist, 1984)
 Mythopoeic Fantasy Award (Finalist, 1986)

See also
Middle Ages Myths/ Melusina

References

1965 Argentine novels
Fantasy novels
Novels by Manuel Mujica Lainez